The 2013–14 season was Inverness Caledonian Thistle's fourth consecutive season in the top flight of Scottish football and the first in the newly established Scottish Premiership, having been promoted from the Scottish First Division at the end of the 2009–10 season. Inverness also competed in the League Cup and the Scottish Cup.

Results and fixtures

Pre-season

Scottish Premiership

Scottish League Cup

Scottish Cup

Player statistics

Captains

Appearances & Goals
Includes all competitive matches. 
Last updated 11 May 2014 

|}

Hat-tricks

Disciplinary record
Includes all competitive matches. 
Last updated 11 May 2014

Team statistics

League table

Position summary

Personnel awards
Last updated 20 April 2014

Transfers

Players in

Players out

See also
 List of Inverness Caledonian Thistle F.C. seasons

References 

2013andndash;14
Inverness Caledonian Thistle